Mir Bacha Kot is a village and the center of Mir Bacha Kot District, Kabul Province, Afghanistan. The village infrastructure was destroyed during the war.

See also 
Kabul Province

References

Populated places in Kabul Province